Anna Margareta Ahlstrand (married Osterman) (14 March 1905 – 16 September 2001) was a Swedish athlete. She competed in the women's high jump at the 1928 Summer Olympics.

References

External links
 

1905 births
2001 deaths
Athletes (track and field) at the 1928 Summer Olympics
Swedish female high jumpers
Olympic athletes of Sweden